The 11033 / 11034 Pune–Darbhanga Gyan Ganga Express is an express that runs between Pune and Darbhanga.

Routing

Traction
The train is hauled by a Pune-based WDP-4D diesel locomotive from Pune to Darbhanga and vice versa.

Direction reversal
The train reverses its direction 3 times at;

 
 
 .

Rake sharing
The train shares its rake with;

 11097/11098 Poorna Express
 22149/22150 Pune–Ernakulam Express.

Time Table
Train numbers are  11033 from Pune to Darbhanga 11034 from Darbhanga to Pune

References

External links
 Pune Darbhanga Express Updated Time Table of train number 11033

Express trains in India
Rail transport in Uttar Pradesh
Rail transport in Madhya Pradesh
Rail transport in Maharashtra
Rail transport in Bihar
Transport in Darbhanga
Transport in Pune